Legend of the Sea Wolf (also known as Larsen, Wolf of the Seven Seas) is a 1975 Italian adventure film directed by Giuseppe Vari. It is based on the 1904 novel The Sea-Wolf by Jack London.

Plot
Author and gentleman Humphrey Van Weyden is shanghaied and wakes up aboard Captain Larsen's ship on a seal hunting voyage of indeterminate length.  Captain Larsen runs a tight ship using "hands on" techniques to quell on–board dissension. With seamanship unknown to Humphrey, he is assigned to the ship's cook as a scullery maid.  The Captain informs Humphrey that the sea voyage will allow him to stand on his own two feet and not walk in his father's shoes.

Unsuccessful in their seal hunt, Captain Larsen decides to poach on the seal hunting area of his brother, Death Larsen. Their ship also rescues three survivors from a steamship that has exploded, Maud Brewster and two stokers.

Cast 

Chuck Connors: Wolf Larsen
Barbara Bach: Maud Brewster
Giuseppe Pambieri: Humphrey Van Weyden
Luciano Pigozzi: Thomas Mugridge 
Ivan Rassimov: Death Larsen 
Rik Battaglia
Pino Ferrara
Lars Bloch
Maurice Poli
Nello Pazzafini
Renato Baldini

References

External links

1975 films
Italian adventure films
Films based on The Sea-Wolf
Films directed by Giuseppe Vari
1970s adventure films
Films scored by Guido & Maurizio De Angelis
Sea adventure films
1970s Italian films